The Chu sanzang jiji (出三藏记集) is the earliest extant catalog of Chinese Buddhist texts. It was compiled by Sengyou of the Liang Dynasty and finished c. 515 CE.

References

Buddhist texts